NGC 7619 is an elliptical galaxy located in the constellation Pegasus. NGC 7619 and NGC 7626 are the dominant and brightest members of the Pegasus galaxy cluster. Both of them were discovered by William Herschel on September 26, 1785.

The radial velocity of this galaxy was measured in 1929 and found to be double that of any galaxy observed at that time. The measurement was consistent with the extrapolated value predicted by Edwin Hubble; a distance-velocity relation that would later become known as Hubble's Law.

In 1970, a type Ia supernova was detected within NGC 7619; it was subsequently designated SN 1970J.

References

External links 
 

Elliptical galaxies
7619
Pegasus (constellation)
Astronomical objects discovered in 1785